Martin J. Gruenberg (born 1953) is an American attorney who serves as the two-time and current chairman, as well as three-time acting chairman, of the U.S. Federal Deposit Insurance Corporation (FDIC).

Education
Gruenberg received an A.B. from Princeton University's Woodrow Wilson School of Public and International Affairs. He received a J.D. from Case Western Reserve University School of Law in 1979.

Career 
Before joining the FDIC Board, Gruenberg served as senior counsel to Senator Paul S. Sarbanes (D-MD) on the staff of the Senate Committee on Banking, Housing, and Urban Affairs (Senate Banking Committee) from 1993 to 2005. He also served as Staff Director of the Banking Committee's Subcommittee on International Finance and Monetary Policy from 1987 to 1992. 

Gruenberg served as chairman of the executive council and president of the International Association of Deposit Insurers from November 2007 to November 2012.

Federal Deposit Insurance Corporation (FDIC) 
Gruenberg has served on the FDIC Board of Directors since August 22, 2005, with confirmations by the Senate on July 29, 2005 by voice vote, on March 29, 2012 by voice vote, and on December 19, 2022 by a vote of 45–39. 

From the beginning of his tenure on the board until his first Senate confirmation as chairman in 2012, Gruenberg served as the Senate-confirmed vice chairman. He served as acting chairman under President George W. Bush from November 16, 2005 to June 26, 2006, until the confirmation of Sheila Bair. 

Gruenberg also served as acting chairman under President Barack Obama from July 9, 2011 to November 28, 2012. In 2011, Obama nominated Gruenberg for a full five-year term as chairman, and was confirmed by the Senate on November 15, 2012. He served as chairman of the FDIC from November 28, 2012 to June 5, 2018. 

In December 2019, he became is the longest-serving director in FDIC history, surpassing Preston Delano, who served in his capacity as Comptroller of the Currency from 1938 to 1953.

Under President Joe Biden, Gruenberg served as acting chairman for a third time beginning on February 5, 2022. Biden nominated Gruenberg for a second full term in November 2022, and the nomination was confirmed by the Senate on December 19, 2022. Gruenberg was sworn in for his second Senate-confirmed term as chairman on January 5, 2023.

References

External links

|-

|-

1953 births
Case Western Reserve University School of Law alumni
Chairs of the Federal Deposit Insurance Corporation
George W. Bush administration personnel
Living people
Obama administration personnel
Princeton School of Public and International Affairs alumni
Trump administration personnel